Roxy Theatre or Roxy Theater may refer to:

Australia
Roxy Theatre (Warner Bros. Movie World), a movie theatre within Warner Bros. Movie World, Queensland
Roxy Community Theatre in Leeton, New South Wales, originally called the Roxy Theatre
Roxy Theatre and Peters Greek Cafe Complex in Bingara, New South Wales
Roxy Theatre, Parramatta, a heritage-listed theatre in Parramatta, Sydney, New South Wales
Roxy Theatre, Sydney, became Mayfair Theatre in 1932

Canada
Roxy Theatre (Edmonton), Alberta
Roxy Theatre (Saskatoon), Saskatchewan
Roxy Theatre (Toronto), Ontario, operated 1935-2006

United States

 Roxie Theater, 1909 movie theater in San Francisco, California
 Roxy Theatre (West Hollywood), California
 Roxy Theater (Miami Beach), Florida
 Roxy Theatre (Atlanta), Georgia
 Roxy Theatre (New York City), not to be confused with the RKO Roxy Theatre, a.k.a. the Center Theatre
 RKO Roxy Theatre in Rockefeller Center, New York City, a.k.a. the Center Theatre
 Roxy Theatre (Langdon, North Dakota), listed on the National Register of Historic Places
 Roxy Theatre (Clarksville, Tennessee)
 Roxy Theatre (Renton), Washington

See also
 Roxy (disambiguation)